Lepidophyma smithii, Smith's tropical night lizard, is a species of lizard in the family Xantusiidae. It is a small lizard found in Mexico, Guatemala, and El Salvador.

References

Lepidophyma
Reptiles of Mexico
Reptiles described in 1876
Taxa named by Marie Firmin Bocourt